Silverleaf is a rural locality in the South Burnett Region, Queensland, Australia. In the  Silverleaf had a population of 57 people.

History 
Silverleaf State School opened on 30 September 1912 and closed circa 1962.

In the  Silverleaf had a population of 57 people.

References 

South Burnett Region
Localities in Queensland